Hide and Seek is a 1932 Fleischer Studios Talkartoon animated short film starring Bimbo.

Synopsis
An unnamed woman (a human "flapper" character, in contrast to the rest of the cast, who are anthropomorphic animals) is making a withdrawal from a bank.  She is eyed by the villain, "I. Grabber, Kidnapper" (he has business cards and a storefront sign so labeling him).  Bimbo is a policeman.   The villain seizes the woman and heads off riding on a goat.  Bimbo takes chase on a motorcycle.  The chase goes up a volcano, which they fall in, descending into "Hell's Kitchen", where the Devil puts the villain and his goat into an oven, and Bimbo and the woman into an icebox.  Bimbo and the woman are rescued by Bimbo's anthropomorphic motorcycle.  They escape through a tunnel through the center of the Earth, emerging in China, where Bimbo and the woman get married.

Music
Tunes on the soundtrack include "Ain't She Sweet",  a strain from the William Tell Overture,  "How Dry I Am",  "I'd Climb the Highest Mountain",  "There'll Be a Hot Time in the Old Town Tonight", "I've Got a Feeling I'm Falling", and "Rock-a-bye Baby".

References

1932 films
1930s American animated films
American black-and-white films
1932 animated films
Paramount Pictures short films
Fleischer Studios short films
Short films directed by Dave Fleischer
Flappers